Man in the Arena: Tom Brady, or simply Man in the Arena, is an American sports documentary series co-produced by ESPN Films, Religion of Sports, and 199 Productions. Directed by Gotham Chopra and Erik LeDrew, the series centers on the career of Tom Brady, with particular focus on his tenure as the New England Patriots starting quarterback.

The First Season of the series ran weekly on ESPN+ from November 16, 2021 through January 11, 2022, with the final episode of Season One delayed until April 25, 2022.

Premise
As described by ESPN's trailer description, Man in the Arena spotlights Brady's first-hand account of his 9 Super Bowl appearances with the New England Patriots, his Super Bowl appearance with the Tampa Bay Buccaneers, being married to a supermodel, and smaller, yet pivotal moments during his career.

Production and release

Development

Co-director Gotham Chopra previously created Tom vs Time (2018), a miniseries about Brady's off-season training regimen and home life. Following the end of Tom vs Time, Chopra stated that there were no plans to create a second season. Shortly prior to signing with the Tampa Bay Buccaneers in March 2020, Brady announced the launch of 199 Productions, a media company designed to produce original documentaries, feature films, and television series.

On May 21, 2020, ESPN released an official trailer for Man in the Arena. The Man in the Arena title is derived from a quote from one of former U.S. President Theodore Roosevelt's speeches. When announcing the series, Brady explained in a tweet:
I have quoted Theodore Roosevelt's "Man in the Arena" speech since I saw it painted on our weight room wall at UM in 1995. It's a constant reminder to ignore the noise, buckle my chinstrap, and battle through whatever comes my way.

ESPN Films co-produced the miniseries along with Chopra's "Religion of Sports" and Brady's 199 Productions company. NFL Films was also involved with the documentary's production.

Upon its announcement, many sports media publications likened the documentary to The Last Dance, which premiered on ESPN in April 2020, and centered on Michael Jordan. Chopra, however, stated: "It's not Tom Brady's Last Dance. It's not that. That may or may not exist 20 years from now, I don't know. There's this sort of immediacy to this... The premise [of The Last Dance] was telling stories about the seasons, whereas [Brady's], it does feel a little bit more real time."

Originally announced as nine-episode miniseries, a tenth episode was eventually confirmed. Each episode goes through each of Brady's Super Bowl appearance seasons, although Brady went to a tenth Super Bowl after the series went into production. Following the release of the ninth episode, Chopra stated that a tenth episode was still in production and would be released sometime in the spring of 2022. That turned out to be on April 25, 2022.

Release
The series' first nine episodes ran weekly from November 16, 2021 to January 11, 2022. The series' tenth episode was slated to be released on January 19, but was delayed until April 25 because Brady was considering retirement.

Episodes

Reception
Sally Jenkins, a columnist for The Washington Post commented on the series, writing: "The documentary is worth watching if only to study how Brady creates equanimity for himself. It's his attempt to overdub the noise, 'the Real Housewives conversation,' as he puts it."

References

2021 American television series debuts
2020s American documentary television series
2020s American television series
American football television series
ESPN Films films
New England Patriots
Tom Brady